Frank Dennis Sando (14 March 1931 – 13 October 2012) was a British long-distance runner. A two-time winner at the International Cross Country Championships (1955, 1957), Sando represented Great Britain in two consecutive Summer Olympic Games.

Early life 
Sando was born on 31 March 1931 in Maidstone, to Ernest and Maria Sando. Attending Maidstone Grammar School, Sando first began his involvement in athletics at sixteen, breaking the school mile record. Simultaneously, he began an amateur career at Maidstone Harriers, winning the Kent County Junior Cross-Country Championship in 1948 and the Kent Youth Cross-Country Championship in 1949. He finished fourth in the English Youth Cross-Country Championship in 1948 and 1949.

Having left school, Sando undertook National Service in October 1949, joining the army. In 1951, he broke the Army three-mile record which had stood for 23 years, having previously that year won the Inter-Services Cross-Country Championship.

Senior career 
Leaving the army in 1951, he began working for the Reed Paper Group in Aylesford, Kent, where he met his future wife Sybil Page. After resigning from Maidstone Harriers, Sando joined the Paper Group's athletics club, juggling work, professional examinations, family commitments and his athletic career. It was at this time that he gained the nickname: the "Maidstone Mudlark".

The following year, 1952, he finished fifth in the National Cross-Country Championships and ninth in the International Cross-Country Championships. Over the next eight years Sando maintained a record of finishing in the top eight positions in the International Championships, as well as an extended period of captaincy of the British team over seven years. In 1952 he was called up to represent Great Britain at the Helsinki Olympic Games, in the 10,000 m. It was in this event that he famously lost a shoe early in the race but, continuing on with one bare foot, he still managed to finish in fifth position.

In 1954 Sando ran in the British Empire and Commonwealth Games, where he finished second in the six miles to Peter Driver and third in the three miles to Chris Chataway. Later in that year he finished third in the 10,000 m in the European Athletics Championships in Berne, Switzerland – which was won by Emil Zátopek. He married Sybil Page in September of the same year.

Sando went on to win the International Cross-Country Championships in San Sebastien, Spain in 1955. In 1956, after returning from injury, he finished second in the International Cross-Country Championships. Running well in the domestic track season of 1956, Sando was selected to represent Great Britain in the 10,000 m in the Olympics of that year, where he finished in tenth position. He later described this as the greatest disappointment of his athletic career, and it was the final time he represented his country on the track. In 1957 Sando won the National Cross-Country Championship at Parliament Hill Fields and the International Championships.

The International Championships of 1958 resulted in a 3rd-place finish for Sando and, in the two consecutive years, he finished 2nd and 8th in the same competition. However, in 1961 he failed to qualify for the national cross-country team. He subsequently decided to retire from serious athletics to concentrate on family commitments and further study, bringing to an end a long sporting career at the top of world athletics.

He was one of many signatories in a letter to The Times on 17 July 1958 opposing 'the policy of apartheid' in international sport and defending 'the principle of racial equality which is embodied in the Declaration of the Olympic Games'.

Later life 
After retiring from athletics, Sando studied at Birkbeck College and graduated with a degree in Statistics in 1964. The following year he resigned from the Reeds Paper Group and joined the Civil Service. He retired from the Civil Service in 1991 as Chief Statistician.

Sando continued his involvement with athletics in an organisational capacity into his later years, having been President of Kent County Athletics Association in 1980 and 2003, as well as various other administrative roles within the county organisation. Subsequent to his presidency of KCAA, he continued to be involved in organising grass roots cross-country events. From 2007–2008, Sando served as President of the Old Maidstonian Society.

Family and personal life 
Sando was married to Sybil and the couple have two children – Lorraine and Andrew – and two grandchildren, Benjamin and Toby Abbott (who both attended Maidstone Grammar School like their grandfather). Until his death in October 2012, Frank continued to live in Aylesford, Kent with his wife – within sight of the Aylesford Paper Mill training ground where his athletic career first began.

References 

 Brown, Geoff and Hogsbjerg, Christian. Apartheid is not a Game: Remembering the Stop the Seventy Tour campaign. London: Redwords, 2020. .

External links 
 
 
 
 
 
 

1931 births
2012 deaths
Military personnel from Kent
20th-century British Army personnel
British Army soldiers
Sportspeople from Maidstone
English male long-distance runners
Olympic athletes of Great Britain
Athletes (track and field) at the 1952 Summer Olympics
Athletes (track and field) at the 1956 Summer Olympics
Commonwealth Games medallists in athletics
Commonwealth Games bronze medallists for England
Commonwealth Games silver medallists for England
Athletes (track and field) at the 1954 British Empire and Commonwealth Games
European Athletics Championships medalists
International Cross Country Championships winners
People educated at Maidstone Grammar School
Alumni of Birkbeck, University of London
Medallists at the 1954 British Empire and Commonwealth Games